Executive Music Group (EMG) is an independent record label located in Dallas, Texas. The label was started in 2004 by Jacob Capricciuolo. EMG represents a wide variety of artists, making them unique among other independent labels. EMG is distributed by Universal Music´s Fontana Distribution. Some of their most well-known artists include or included Dirty Heads, 12 Stones, Alien Ant Farm, Lacey Schwimmer, Khleo Thomas, The Katinas, Niyoki, and Shock of Pleasure.

Roster
 12 Stones
 Alien Ant Farm
 Big Beam
 Dirty Heads
 The Heroine
 Jamiroquai
 The Katinas
 Niyoki
 Portable Payback
 Lacey Schwimmer
 Shock of Pleasure
 Khleo Thomas (with Executive Dream)
 The Weekend Forecast

References

External links
 

American independent record labels